Seva, Ghana is located in the Keta Lagoon in the Keta district now Municipal of Ghana. Seva is one of the islands forming the archipelago of the Keta Lagoon. It covers an area of approximately 2.7 square miles.
This island is important as a bird-watching site because it is a stopover point for many migratory birds. The town has many attractions such as the sandy beaches, general cleanliness and local storytelling in Ewe. Historians are unable to determine a date for the founding of the town.

History of Seva 
The people of Seva are part of the Ewe who migrated from Notsie in the Republic of Togo Seva is divided into the north (Adziehe) and South (Anyiehe) divisions. However, one can construct a time frame from oral tradition and artefacts especially about those of the early chiefs and wars. The settlement must have begun before 1700.

There are three Chieftaincy Stools in Seva, namely Lotsu Makwa, Adzomani and Adoblanui-Xornyo Stools. The Lotsu Makwa Stool is the Dufia Stool or Senior Chief Stool. Its occupant, Lotsu Makwa IV, has abdicated, but which abdication is not recognized by the Anlo Traditional Council. The current occupant of the Adzomani Stool is Togbi Adzomani II, while the Adoblanui-Xornyo Stool has a regent, Gabriel Agbewole (Abbeworle), the last occupant of the Stool, Togbi Atsapo-Xornyo, known in private life as Richard Kofi Atsakpo, having died on December 24, 2013.

The island was important as a bird watching site. It is inhabited by a large community of Anlo-Ewe-speaking people. Their major vocation is Kete cloth weaving. They also are engaged in fishing.

The AME Zion Church was the first to establish its presence in Seva and came along with a school which now serves the junior high school level. The AME church has got a stronghold in the town and has created a school.

The town has many attractions including local storytelling in Ewe which is undertaken as a pastime activity
The greatest challenge of the town is lack of pipe-borne water. All inhabitants of Seva township harvest rain water and store it in tanks for use by the households and the schools.

Short history of church and school
A short history of the A.M.E. Zion Church (Revival Society) and the A.M.E. Zion Basic School, Seva

Introduction
Until recently, when a road was carved through from Konu, near Anyako, Seva was a complete island surrounded by a body of brackish water― the Keta Lagoon.
Seva was, then, separated from Anyako by about three-quarters of a kilometer of lagoon water.
As far back as 1857, the Bremen Mission had already opened a school and a church at Anyako. As late as 1937 Seva was still without a school and a church.
Thus, before the late 1930s, citizens of Seva who were determined to receive formal education had to commute between Seva and Anyako, either by canoe or by fording the lagoon to and from school.

The first school children
Among those determined school children were Lotsu, Zaney, Hukporti, Kumordzi, Beckley, Tay, Womoakor, Ametamenya, Dzimabi and Abiemo. The others were Adadevo, Kudekor, Agezo, Doe and Dellor.
In 1917, there was a heavy flooding of the lagoon waters which rendered fording to and from school at Anyako impossible, hence these school children relocated to Keta to continue their education.
Around this time, the Salvation Army Church had begun to establish its presence in Seva under the leadership of one Godwin Segbawu from Woe.
 
As time went on, this group of children (now educated young men) formed an association called the Seva Literacy Club with the objective of bringing western education to Seva―and through the initiative of the club, the Salvation Army started a school in N.B Zaney's house at Seva.

However, at a point, the club could no longer afford the monthly remuneration of thirty (30) shillings it had agreed to pay Mr Segbawu for his services as a teacher.
This sent the Salvation Army Church packing off after three years of missionary work and after having started a school in Seva.

Towards the end of 1937, consultations began with the African Methodist Episcopal (A.M.E.) Zion Church after the Bremen Mission had declined the request to establish a church in Seva. 
A delegation under the leadership of N.B. Zaney went to see Rev. Alfred A. Adjahoe, the then Presiding Elder, Bishop's Deputy and Pastor-in-Charge of the St John A.M. E. Zion Church, Keta, with the request which was approved after meeting with members of the church cabinet, officers and leaders.

Arrival of the A.M.E Zion Church at Seva
In May 1938, Rev. Alfred A. Adjahoe and his team of pastors, officers and the leaders came to Seva together with the citizens of Seva residing at Keta, i.e., N. B. Zaney, J. B. Kumordzie, N. B. Lotsu, Gershon Kwakuga Abiemo and Gershon K. Ocloo, among others, to perform the ceremony for the establishment of the church and school. 
Three Reverend Ministers of the A.M. E. Zion Church followed in succession to begin work on planting the A.M.E. Zion Church in Seva.

Reverend Adjahoe was followed by Reverend J.K.O. Lavie as the first pastors of the A.M.E. Zion Church, Seva. Then came Reverend Albert Sevor from Agavedzi who made a significant contribution to the laying of the foundations of the church in Seva.

Rev. Sevor started with zeal and led the school children and a few other persons of the town, instructing them in the word and teaching them the Creed, the Lord ’s Prayer and the Commandments.
By the close of 1938, the first group of Christians were baptized by Rev. Alfred A. Adjahoe and the second group in early 1939, all of whom were later received into full communion by the same Reverend Adjahoe.

Acquisition of land for the church and the school
In 1939, Amega Agbavitor Alorgbodzi, a citizen of Seva, who was then residing at Ehi, one of the 36 townships of Seva, heard about developments in his hometown, Seva, and being the head of the Alorgbodzi family, returned to Seva to support a worthy cause by offering a portion of his family land on which he had planted coconut trees to be used for building the church and school. 
The records indicate that Rev. Adjahoe wanted an outright purchase of the land together with the coconut trees but Amega Alorgbodzi declined the request and it was agreed that the land was a gift, but the coconut trees and their fruits belonged to the original landowner in perpetuity.

Soon after the acquisition of the land, a chapel and the school were put up with clay, roofed with iron roofing sheets and the walls painted with coaltar.

Reception into Conference
Rev. Sevor's work was continued by three other ministers―W.M. Helegbe from Woe, J.S. Sosu from Tegbi and one Mr Pomeyie.
In 1942, under the missionary Pastor, Bro. J.S. Sosu, and the circuit Pastor, Rev. J.K.O. Lavie, the church was received into Conference.

Church Membership 
During the years of Pastors J.S. Sosu and Armstrong, membership increased and the majority of the town folks were baptized. However, due to the school children leaving the town to continue their education at other schools at Anyako and Keta, and the fact that some of the children could not get admission into Zion schools and, therefore, had to join the denominations of the schools where they gained admission, membership of the A.M. E. Zion Church at Seva dwindled.

Destruction of the chapel and the school building
In 1963/64, there was another great flooding of the Keta Lagoon which destroyed both the chapel and the school buildings. Fortunately, the Department of Social Welfare and Community Development came to the aid of the church by providing a quantity of cement and roofing sheets for the reconstruction of the school.

Deprived of a chapel, the congregation worshiped in one of the classrooms. Later, a committee was then formed with Rev. Jasper K. Atsakpo as chairman, assisted by Bro. James Dzimabi to explore avenues for putting up a new chapel.

Mr. E.B. Zaney was the first to donate fifty-five (55) bags of cement which were molded into blocks for the construction of the chapel. Other donations for the chapel building project were made on Easter Sunday services through appeals for fund.

Sod cutting for the start of the chapel building was done by Rev. E.K. Pomeyie, assisted by Rev. J.M.K. Atsakpo while the foundation stone was laid by Rev. J.B.C. Adjavor, the then Presiding Elder of the Agbozume District.

Picture of sod cutting

The building of the chapel was spearheaded by Rev. James Kwami Dzimabi, the first ordained resident-native pastor of the church.

Establishment of middle school
At the beginning of 1964, formal education at Seva ended at the primary level and products of the primary school had to continue their education at Anyako or elsewhere. 
To address the challenge of fording the lagoon to and from Anyako on a daily basis for their middle school education, the Town Development Association, in collaboration with the chiefs of the town, sent a delegation to the District Assistant Director of Education, Keta, in the later part of 1964 to apply for the establishment of a Middle school at Seva.
Consequently, a team of officers from the District Education Office was dispatched to Seva for an assessment of the facilities (two classrooms had been put up in readiness for the middle school system).

By the beginning of the 1964/65 academic year, permission was granted for the establishment of a middle school in Seva, with Mr Acquayee from Anyako, as the first head teacher who was succeeded by Mr. Zaglago, followed by Mr. A.K. Kongo who was posted to the school to take over the leadership of both the primary and the middle schools.

From 1984 to 1987 the primary and middle schools came under different heads, with Mr Victor Tay as head of the middle school and Mr James Kwami Dzimabi as head of the primary school.
Upon the introduction of the junior high school concept, Mr Nyonyo was transferred from Kedzi to take over as the first headmaster.

When Mr. Nyonyo was transferred, Mr Dzimabi assumed duty as acting headmaster until a substantive head in the person of Mr. Dogbey was posted to Seva. Not long after, Mr Dogbey died and Mr Dzimabi resumed his acting capacity position. After Mr Dogbey, the successive heads were Mr Daniel Ayikutu, Mr TSovi Dzakpasu, Mr Goka and Mr Solomon Senyo who is currently the headmaster.

Circuit pastors of the church
The following―Rev. J.K.O. Lavie, Rev. Katriku, Rev. W.A.A. Abormega, Rev. R.E.M. Kwawukumey and Rev. Felix Dodoer―were the Circuit pastor of the church

Missionary/Assistant pastors of the church
Mr A.K. Sevor, Mr W.M. Helegbe, Mr J.S. Sosu, Mr Armstrong, Mr Joseph Hadui Hukporti, Mr S.W.K. Kumah, Mr E.K. Sosu, Mr K. Kumordzi, Mr S.S. Semaha, Mr James K. Atsakpo, Mr A.K. Kongo, Mr Gati, Mr Agbeko, Mr M.K. Mensah, Mr Dellor, Mr Dawuso, Mr Wemegah, Mr James Dzimabi, Mr David Tay-Suka, Sis. Alice Womoakor and Mr Lawson Dumedea had led the church either as missionary or assistant pastors of the church.

Currently, Mr Alex Woamekpor and Sis. Rosemond Agorsor are assisting the pastor.
It is important to note that all the assistant pastors in reference were or are also teachers of the school. It is equally important to mention that the first ordained pastor of the church, since church planting, was Rev. J.K. Dzimabi. He was followed by Rev. Devine Tay-Suka and Rev. Philip Hlordzi who is currently the Pastor-in-Charge.

Achievements of the school and church
The church and school, together, produced Ministers of the Gospel, distinguished scholars and other prominent personalities.
The most notable of the Ministers of the Gospel are Rev. J.K. Dzimabi, Rev. Godson Ocloo, Rev. Livingstone Torsu and Rev. Francis Busenu Deku while others are on the verge of ordination as ministers and evangelists.

Among the distinguished scholars are Dr Daniel Kodzo Avorgbedor and Dr Clement Agezo who are all full professors while several others have attained very high laurels on the educational ladder―as high as to the Masters level.

Other products of the school are well-placed in various vocations and professions within and outside Ghana. Indeed, one can hardly forget to mention Lawyer David Agorsor, a product of the Seva primary and middle school system.

The first group of graduates of the middle school were Eva Agorsor, Gershon Torsu, Simon Alemawor, Paulina Agezo, Elizabeth Hukporti, Alice Kumordzi, Lucia Womoakor, Bertha Kudekor, Keneth Doe, Freeman Alemawor, Julius Abiemo, Bradina Sosu, Emmanuel Ziga Kudekor, Daniel Seke Dogbey, Bernard Kofi Hukporti, Francis Kwasi Bokorvi and Brilliant Besa Dzimabi. 
The last group of the middle school system are Raymond Tsoeke Abiemo, Jacob Kudjo Alorgbodzi, Alex Atsu Dellor, Honour Selasi Dzimabi, Ambrose Kwadzo Hukporti, Isaac Kwami Torsu, Moses Kwasi Torsu, Rose Akos Torsu, Simon Torsu, Kwasi Torsu and John Eklu Anaglate.

And, among the firstgroup of JHS graduates in 1990 were Kokui Eunice Akpanya, Vivian Kpodo, Charity Amese, Dora Amewoseanyana, Mawusi Avukpor, Bernice Kwasiwor Ocloo, Besa Kudekor, Peter Fanam Dzaka, Israel Kongo and Ephraim Amese.

Outstanding performance of the church choir
At a Choir Festival at Keta during the 1991/1992 Annual Conference, the Seva A.M.E. Zion Church Choir, with Sis. Alice Womoakor as conductor, emerged winners.

As the choir did not have robes at that time, an appeal for funds was launched by Rev. Jasper M.K. Atsakpo during the 1993 Easter Sunday Church Service which yielded enough funds to procure eighteen robes or choir gowns which were sewn free of charge by Sis. Lorlor Torsu.

Challenges
Among the challenges facing the school and church are: 
1. Decline in enrollment and membership as the majority of members leave the town after completion of school for further studies or in search of jobs; 
2. Backsliding of members due to peer pressure or family influence; and 
3. Uncompromising stance of traditional authority in compelling the church to succumb to their rules.

Acknowledgement of donations to the school 
The following persons have donated assorted materials/cash towards the promotion of teaching and learning in the school.
(NB) 9 of the materials cannot be listed as they are many (The records are available at the headmaster's office).
1.  Mr Bonuedi (Assembly Man) 
2.  Mr Moses Torsu (Unit Committee Chairman) 
3.  Mr Evans Dzikunu 
4.  Happy Science Ghana (EMDEN-Donkor Blenddof) 
5.  SEDA/SEYA- (2015 Easter) 
6.  Hon. Richard Quarshigah 
7.  Mr Livingstone Tay- USA 
8.  SEDA- Ashiaman Branch (2016) 
9.  Togbi Apossah Family of Anyako (2017) 
10. Right To Play (Int. NGO) 
11. Mad. Eugenia Dellor – South California 
12. Juliana Worlali Zaney – 1 set of school band

In 2018, the primary block at Seva A.M.E. Zion primary school was renovated by The Distant Relatives Project Corporation. The team also built a library and installed electricity in the campus. Each year, they supply the students with school supplies to last the entire semester. The Distant Relatives Project is a 501c3 nonprofit organization that is based in Washington DC. Their mission is committed to the development of underserved communities in Ghana, by creating opportunity and access to resources. Distant Relatives has become the official partner of Seva, Ghana (Distant-Relatives.org).

To the church
1. Mr Ben Kofi Doe (Drawing of the chapel plan) 
2. Mr Theophilus Kwadzo Hukporti (A set of band, 1 key board, speakers, cordless microphones, and a cash donation of 1,700 Ghana Cedis (Ghc 1,700.00) used for the procurement and fixing of chapel doors) 
3. Prof. Daniel Avorgbedor (One key board, 1 master drum and a gas light)

The following persons also deserve mention:
Rev. Godson Ocloo, Crusader and Organizing Secretary of the Anniversary Central Planning Committee (CPC), Mr Emmanuel Dzimabi, chairman, CPC, Mr Gershon Kwaku Kumor, Vice Chairman (CPC), Mr Gidiglo, General Secretary (CPC), Mr Israel Goka, Treasurer (CPC), Mr Daniel Gayeye Hukporti, member (CPC) and Mr Edward Seth Dzimabi, member (CPC) 
Compiled and updated by Rev. J. K. Dzimabi & G.D. Zaney, Esq. from the records of Rev. Jasper M.K. Atsakpo, Mr Joseph Hadui Hukporti and a book written by G.D. Zaney, Esq., entitled ‘The History of Seva’.

Music in Seva 
The people of Seva are noted for their expertise in music and dance. They are experts in the African rattle music (xatsevu) and the singing of halo songs (songs of abuse).

Occupations in Seva 
Seva is one of the renowned locations for the weaving industry among the Ewe people and which were frequented by Yoruba and Hausa traders, the main clientele traveled from Nigeria to the Keta and Agbozume markets in the Volta Region, Ghana. 
Another important occupation is fishing. Crabs, shrimps and tilapia are caught in the Keta Lagoon.
The area is a critical area of salt production in the Keta area

The main mode of transportation was sail boats before the town was connected by a feeder road to Anyako-Konu.

Prominent citizens 
 G. D. Zaney, Esq. of the Ghana Information Services Department, a Civil Servant, Historian, Genealogist, Lawyer and a Journalist 
 Daniel K. Avorgbedor Music Professor at Ohio State University

Further reading 
 The Impact of Rural-Urban Migration on a Village Music Culture: Some Implications for Applied Ethnomusicology. Daniel K. Avorgbedor. African Music Vol. 7, No. 2 (1992), pp. 45–57
Published by: International Library of African Music

References

Populated places in the Volta Region
Islands of Ghana